National Route 88 is a national highway in South Korea connecting Yeongyang County to Uljin County. It was established on 25 July 2001.

Main stopovers
North Gyeongsang Province
 Yeongyang County - Uljin County

Major intersections

 (■): Motorway
IS: Intersection, IC: Interchange

North Gyeongsang Province

References

88
Roads in North Gyeongsang